John Ross (24 January 1945 – 30 August 2009) was a Canadian rower. He competed in the men's coxed eight event at the 1968 Summer Olympics.

References

1945 births
2009 deaths
Canadian male rowers
Olympic rowers of Canada
Rowers at the 1968 Summer Olympics
Sportspeople from Ontario